Cienfuegos is one of the provinces of Cuba. The capital city of the province is also called Cienfuegos and was founded by French settlers in 1819.

Overview

Until 2011, Cienfuegos was the smallest province in Cuba (excluding the city of Havana and the Isla de la Juventud) with an economy almost entirely dedicated to the growing and processing of sugar. Sugar mills and sugarcane plantations dot the landscape. There are waterfalls in the sierra of the province.

Scuba diving off Cienfuegos province is extremely popular both with tourists and locals. There are numerous underwater caves, and well over 50 dive sites in the province.

The provinces of Cienfuegos, Sancti Spíritus, and Villa Clara were once all part of the now defunct province of Santa Clara.

Municipalities 

Source: Population from 2004 Census. Area from 1976 municipal re-distribution.

Demographics
In 2004, the province of Cienfuegos had a population of 398,647.

References

External links

Cienfuegos (Spanish)

 
Provinces of Cuba
 States and territories established in 1976